Košariská is a village and municipality in Myjava District in the Trenčín Region of north-western Slovakia.

History 
In historical records the village was first mentioned in 1786.

Geography 
The municipality lies at an altitude of 249 metres and covers an area of 11.531 km². It has a population of about 403 people.

Famous people 
 Milan Rastislav Štefánik, General, astronomer, and politician

Genealogical resources

The records for genealogical research are available at the state archive "Statny Archiv in Bratislava, Slovakia"

 Roman Catholic church records (births/marriages/deaths): 1788-1910 (parish B)
 Lutheran church records (births/marriages/deaths): 1720-1952 (parish A)

See also
 List of municipalities and towns in Slovakia

References

External links 

  Official page
Surnames of living people in Kosariska

Villages and municipalities in Myjava District